is a passenger railway station located in the city of Ōme, Tokyo, Japan, operated by the East Japan Railway Company (JR East).

Lines
Ikusabata Station is served by the Ōme Line, located 24.5 kilometers from the terminus of the line at Tachikawa Station.

Station layout
The station has one side platform serving a single bi-directional track. The station is unattended.

Platform

History
The station opened on 1 September 1929. It was nationalized on 1 April 1944. It became part of the East Japan Railway Company (JR East) with the breakup of the Japanese National Railways on 1 April 1987.

Passenger statistics
In fiscal 2010, the station was used by an average of 238 passengers daily (boarding passengers only).

Surrounding area
 
 Tama River

See also
 List of railway stations in Japan

References

External links 

 JR East Station information (JR East) 

Railway stations in Tokyo
Ōme Line
Stations of East Japan Railway Company
Railway stations in Japan opened in 1929
Ōme, Tokyo